Castrejón de Trabancos is a village in Valladolid, Castile-Leon, Spain.

References

Populated places in the Province of Valladolid